Shakadvipa, is an island featured in Hindu mythology. The island is named after a great teak tree that is stated to venerated in its midst. Its terrain and inhabitants are described in the Puranas.

Literature

Brahma Purana 
According to the Brahma Purana, the ocean known as Kshira Sagara is surrounded by Shakadvipa, which is described to be twice the size of Kraunchadvipa, another island. The sovereign of the island is called Bhavya, and he is mentioned as having seven sons, offering each a region of the land: Jalada, Sukumara, Kaumara, Maṇīcaka, Kusumottara, Modaka, and Mahadruma. The seven mountains that exist on this island are Udaya, Jaladhara, Raivataka, Shyama, Ambikeya, Astikeya, and Kesari. A great shaka (teak) tree is described to grow there, frequented by gandharvas and siddhas. The members of the four varnas who live here do so without contracting any disease. The Magas are the Brahmanas, the Magadhas are the Kshatriyas, the Manasas are the Vaishyas, and the Mandagas are the Shudras. The seven sacred rivers that flow through this island are stated to be Sukumari, Kumari, Nalini, Renuka, Ikshu, Dhenuka, and Gabhasti. No excesses of any emotion are stated to be experienced by the islanders. Vishnu is stated to be worshipped here, in his form of Surya.

Vishnu Purana 
The account of Shakadvipa in the Vishnu Purana is much the same as the Brahma Purana. The inhabitants of this island are described to be extremely virtuous, feeling no jealousy and transgressing no boundaries.

See also
Jambudvipa
Plaksadvipa
Manidvipa

References 

Locations in Hindu mythology
Mythological islands